Raquel Rodríguez Cedeño (born 28 October 1993) is a Costa Rican professional footballer who plays as an attacking midfielder for Portland Thorns FC of the National Women's Soccer League and the Costa Rica women's national team.

Early life
Born in San José, Costa Rica to Sivianni Rodriguez and Grettel Cedeño, Rodriguez, nicknamed Rocky, was raised in Costa Rica and moved to the United States where support for women's soccer offered more opportunity. Her father, Sivianni Rodríguez, played professionally in Costa Rica with Herediano and the Costa Rica national football team.

Rodriquez began playing soccer at age four and played on boys teams and trained with her brother and father as a youth. At age 11, her cousin told her one of the well-known men's club teams was holding tryouts for a women's team. After trying out, she played for the team's under-15 team. She played for the high school team while still attending elementary school. Both Raquel and her brother, Sivianni, attended International Christian School. She played for the school's team for a short while before committing to play for Costa Rica's national teams.

Penn State, 2012–2015
Rodriguez was a four-year starter for the Penn State Nittany Lions. As the 2015 team captain, she led her team to victory at the NCAA College Cup by scoring the game-winning goal against the Duke Blue Devils. Rodriguez received numerous awards in 2015, including NSCAA Scholar Player of the Year, Top Drawer Soccer Player of the Year, and she was the 2015 recipient of the Mac Herman Trophy. As a senior, she won the Honda Sports Award as the nation's top soccer player.

Club career

Sky Blue FC, 2016–2019
Rodríguez was selected second overall by Sky Blue FC in the 2016 NWSL College Draft. In her rookie season, she scored 1 goal in 18 matches, and at the end of the season was named NWSL Rookie of the Year. In the 2017 season, Rodríguez scored the fastest goal in NWSL history, netting 24 seconds from kick-off against Portland Thorns FC.

Perth Glory, 2017
On 12 October 2017, Rodríguez joined Perth Glory for the 2017–18 W-League season. Rodríguez is the first Central American ever to play in the W-League.

Portland Thorns FC
On 8 January 2020, Rodríguez was traded to Portland Thorns FC.

International career
During the 2015 FIFA Women's World Cup, Rodriguez scored Costa Rica's first ever Women's World Cup goal during the opening Group Stage match against Spain, which ended 1–1. Rodriguez played in all of Costa Rica's three matches in the tournament. During the CONCACAF Olympic Qualifying tournament, Rodriguez scored five goals in the three group stage matches.

International goals

Honors and awards

Club
Portland Thorns FC
 NWSL Community Shield: 2020
 NWSL Challenge Cup: 2021
 International Champions Cup: 2021
 NWSL Shield: 2021
 NWSL Championship: 2022

Individual 

 NWSL Rookie of the Year: 2016

References

External links

 
 Profile  at Fedefutbol
 

1993 births
Living people
Women's association football forwards
Costa Rican women's footballers
Footballers from San José, Costa Rica
Costa Rica women's international footballers
2015 FIFA Women's World Cup players
Pan American Games bronze medalists for Costa Rica
Pan American Games medalists in football
Footballers at the 2019 Pan American Games
Footballers at the 2011 Pan American Games
Footballers at the 2015 Pan American Games
Central American Games gold medalists for Costa Rica
Central American Games medalists in football
Penn State Nittany Lions women's soccer players
Hermann Trophy women's winners
NJ/NY Gotham FC draft picks
National Women's Soccer League players
NJ/NY Gotham FC players
A-League Women players
Perth Glory FC (A-League Women) players
Costa Rican expatriate footballers
Costa Rican expatriate sportspeople in the United States
Expatriate women's soccer players in the United States
Costa Rican expatriate sportspeople in Australia
Expatriate women's soccer players in Australia
Portland Thorns FC players
Medalists at the 2019 Pan American Games